The Gabon national football team (French: Équipe de football du Gabon)  represents Gabon in men's international football. The team's nickname is The Panthers and it is governed by the Gabonese Football Federation. They have never qualified for the FIFA World Cup, but have qualified eight times (as of 2021) for the Africa Cup of Nations. The team represents both FIFA and Confederation of African Football (CAF).

History

1960s
Gabon made their debut on 13 April 1960 by entering the first Friendship Games (Jeux de L'Amitié) tournament, created for French-speaking African countries (a precursor to the modern African Games), held in Antananarivo, Madagascar. In the First Round they were drawn against Upper Volta (now Burkina Faso), who were also making their debut, and lost 5–4, despite leading 3–2 at half-time. They did not play another match for over a year and a half, until the next time the tournament was staged, in December 1961 in Abidjan, Ivory Coast. They were drawn in Pool 3 alongside Cameroon and Senegal. Gabon began the tournament with a 3–2 defeat to Senegal on Christmas Day, before being thrashed 6–0 by Cameroon on Boxing Day, finishing bottom of their group. A few months after the tournament, the Gabonese Football Federation (Federation Gabonaise de Football) was formed to officially oversee the development of the national team and the domestic game. The new association would not have to wait long for their first win, as in their very next match on 14 July 1962 they defeated the Congo 3–1 in their first match on home soil. They played 2 more matches in 1962, a 1–1 home draw with Cameroon on 20 August, a vast improvement over their previous meeting, and a 3–1 away defeat to the Congo on 16 September, before entering the third and final Friendship Games held in April 1963 in Dakar, Senegal. They were drawn in Group C, along with British Gambia, the France amateur team, and Upper Volta. They opened on 12 April with a strong 4–0 win over Upper Volta, but were comfortably beaten 3–0 by the French amateurs 2 days later. They drew their final game 2–2 with British Gambia on 16 April and finished 2nd in the group, a marked improvement over their previous 2 appearances at the tournament; however only the group winners progressed and therefore Gabon were eliminated. A few months later, Gabon entered qualification for the 1966 FIFA World Cup held in England. However, on 8 October 1964 they withdrew from the competition, along with all the other African entrants, in protest at FIFA's decision to only award 1 finals place to all of Africa, Asia and Oceania.

As a result of this boycott, Gabon did not play another match for over two years until August 1965, when they hosted a friendly double-header against Nigeria, drawing 2–2 on 28 August and losing 4–1 the next day. At the 35th FIFA Congress held in London, England on 6 July 1966, Gabon were officially admitted as full members of FIFA. They played their next match on 2 December 1966 when they suffered a 4–3 defeat against the Democratic Republic of the Congo, before playing them again on 4 January 1967 at home, this time winning 1–0. They played one more friendly, a 3–0 home defeat to the Ivory Coast on 28 March, before entering qualification for the 1968 Olympic football tournament, held in Mexico. In the First Round, they were drawn against Guinea with whom they drew the first leg 0–0 at home on 18 June, before being routed in the second leg 6–1, on 9 July. In 1967, they also became full members of CAF. Following on from the Olympic qualifiers, Gabon did not play another match for over two years until they travelled to Dahomey (now Benin) on 24 August 1969 to play a friendly, which they lost 1–0.

1970s
Gabon then did not play for over a year, before entering qualification for the Africa Cup of Nations for the first time. Their attempt to qualify for the 1972 tournament held in Cameroon fell at the first hurdle however, as they were drawn against Ivory Coast in the First Round. They lost the first leg at home 2–1 on 8 November 1970, and were defeated 1–0 away two weeks later. Gabon then entered qualification for the 1972 Olympic football tournament held in West Germany. In the First Round they were drawn against Cameroon. Having lost the first leg 3–2 in Libreville on 30 May 1971, Gabon forfeited the tie as they did not travel to Yaoundé to contest the return leg. Following this ignominious exit, Gabon entered qualification for the 1974 FIFA World Cup held in West Germany, and were due to play Cameroon in the First Round the Summer of 1972, however they withdrew before the matches could be played.  As a result of this withdrawal, they did not play another match for over a year until they entered the football tournament at the 1972 Central African Cup (a precursor to the Central African Games) held in Brazzaville, Congo. The 5-team round robin tournament included, alongside Gabon; Cameroon, the Central African Republic, the Congo, and Chad. They played their first match on 16 July against the Congo, losing 3–0. Two days later they were defeated 3–1 by the Central African Republic and on 20 July they were soundly beaten by Cameroon, 4–0. However they salvaged some pride by beating Chad 1–0 in their final match on 22 July to avoid the bottom spot. Furthermore, this tournament doubled up as a qualification group for the 1973 All-Africa Games football tournament, and as Gabon did not win the group, they failed to qualify. A year later they entered qualification for the 1974 African Cup of Nations held in Egypt, and were due to play the Central African Republic in the summer of 1973, however they once again withdrew before a ball was kicked.

As a result, Gabon did not play a single match for almost 4 years until they thrashed São Tomé and Príncipe 6–1 at home in a friendly in May 1976, which was São Tomé and Príncipe's first international match. A few weeks later Gabon hosted the inaugural Central African Games. In the football tournament, they were drawn into Group B alongside Burundi, Cameroon and Rwanda. They played their opening match on 28 June, registering a convincing 4–1 win over Burundi. Then, on 1 July they played out a 1–1 draw against Zaire who had travelled to Gabon to play each team in Group B in a friendly capacity, and had not entered the competition proper. On 5 July Gabon gained another impressive victory, beating Rwanda 3–0. In their final group game on 7 July they held neighbours Cameroon to creditable 0–0 draw, thus securing 2nd place (having only missed out on the top spot via goal difference) and qualification for the semi-finals. On 9 July they faced Group A winners the Congo, and were narrowly beaten 1–0. However, two days later they managed to clinch 3rd place with a 3–1 victory of the Central African Republic, to put the seal on an impressive performance in their own tournament. A year later, Gabon entered qualification for the 1978 African Cup of Nations held in Ghana. After being given a bye in the First Round, they were drawn against the Congo in the Second. They lost the first leg away 3–2 on 17 July 1977, and drew the second at home 3–3 on 31 July, losing 6–5 on aggregate. Later that year, they entered a qualification tournament for the football competition at the 1978 All-Africa Games held in Algiers, Algeria. The qualification tournament for their zone, which was held in Cameroon, consisted of 2 groups, with the top two teams in each group progressing to the semi-finals. In Gabon's group (B) were Burundi, the Congo and Equatorial Guinea. They beat Equatorial Guinea 2–0 in their opening match on Christmas Eve, defeated the Congo 1–0 on Boxing Day and beat Burundi 2-0 two days later. With 3 wins out of 3, they topped their group and faced Group A runners-up Chad in the semi-finals to whom they lost 3–1 on New Year's Eve, and therefore failed to qualify, as only the tournament winner went to the finals. A few months later in February 1978, they hosted a friendly against Nigeria, which they lost 1–0. In January 1979 they registered a 2–2 away draw against Rwanda, before defeating Ivory Coast 2–1 at home in April.

2010s
In the 2010 Africa Cup of Nations, Gabon upset Cameroon 1–0 and had a good chance of progressing to the quarter-finals after a scoreless draw against Tunisia. However, Gabon lost 2–1 to Zambia as it finished in its group with a three-way tie with Zambia and Cameroon. Gabon only scored twice in the group stage and were eliminated on the goals scored tiebreaker. 
In 2012 Africa Cup of Nations, Gabon co-hosted the tournament as it won their group matches: 2–0 against Niger, 3–2 against Morocco, and 1–0 against Tunisia. The second match saw Gabon qualify for its first quarter-final since 1996 in the most dramatic circumstances. Gabon had come back to lead 2–1 only for Morocco to tie the match in early stoppage time. However, on the final play of the game, Gabon scored in the eighth minute of stoppage time, from a direct free kick. Eventually, Gabon lost 5–4 in penalties (1–1 a.e.t) in the quarterfinal against Mali, after a penalty missed by Pierre-Emerick Aubameyang, who had scored three goals in the tournament.

Gabon began its 2014 World Cup qualifying campaign in the second round in Group E as it was drawn with Niger, Burkina Faso, and Congo. Despite opening its campaign with a scoreless draw against Niger, Gabon lost 3–0 due to having fielded ineligible player Charly Moussono. After four qualifiers, Gabon scored only one goal, but thanks to an Aubameyang hat-trick on 15 June 2013, Gabon stayed in contention for a play-off berth with a 4–1 victory over Niger. However, Burkina Faso eliminated Gabon in the final qualifier with the 1–0 result as Gabon finished third in its group.

For the 2013 Africa Cup of Nations, Gabon has been drawn to qualify against Togo. Even though Daniel Cousin scored in each leg against Togo, Gabon missed out on the 2013 Africa Cup of Nations as it lost 3–2 on aggregate. A year later, Gabon played six qualifiers for the 2015 Africa Cup of Nations as it was drawn with Burkina Faso, Angola and Lesotho. Despite a stunning 1–1 result in Lesotho in qualifying, Gabon finished ahead of Burkina Faso to top the group as it qualified for the tournament with a game to spare in Angola. In January 2015, Gabon was drawn along with Burkina Faso, Congo and Equatorial Guinea. However, its 2–0 victory on the opening day of the tournament were all the points Gabon achieved during the tournament as it suffered a shocking exit in the group stage.

Results and fixtures 
The following is a list of match results in the last 12 months, as well as any future matches that have been scheduled.

2022

2023

Coaching history
Caretaker managers are listed in italics.

 Jean Prouff (1960)
 Robert Vicot (1979)
 Alain de Martigny (1985–1986)
 Nedeljko Bulatović (1986–1987)
 Alain Da Costa (1987–1989)
 Karl-Heinz Weigang (1989–1994)
 Edouard Eroumbengani (1989–1991)
 Robert Pintenat (1991–1992)
 Jean Thissen (1992–1994)
 Alain Da Costa (1994–1997)
 Serge Devèze (1997–1998)
 Antônio Dumas (1998–2000)
 Claude Rayelomanan (2000)
 Alain Da Costa (2000–2002)
 Michel De Wolf (2002–2003)
 Claude Albert Mbourounot (2003)
 Jairzinho (2003–2005)
 Raphaël Nzamba-Nzamba (2005–2006)
 Alain Giresse (2006–2010)
 Gernot Rohr (2010–2012)
 Paulo Jorge Rebelo Duarte (2012–2013)
 Stéphane Bounguendza (2014)
 Jorge Costa (2014–2016)
 José António Garrido (2016)
 José Antonio Camacho (2016–2018)
 Daniel Cousin (2018–2019)
 Patrice Neveu (2019–present)

Players

Current squad
The following players were called up for the 2023 Africa Cup of Nations qualification matches against Sudan on 23 and 27 March 2023.

Caps and goals correct as of: 20 November 2022, after the match against

Recent call-ups
The following players have been called up for Gabon in the last 12 months.

DEC Player refused to join the team after the call-up.
INJ Player withdrew from the squad due to an injury.
PRE Preliminary squad.
RET Player has retired from international football.
SUS Suspended from the national team.

Records

Players in bold are still active with Gabon.

Most appearances

Top goalscorers

Competition records

FIFA World Cup

Africa Cup of Nations

African Nations Championship record
2009 – Did not qualify
2011 – Group stage
2014 – Quarter-finals
2016 – Group stage
2018 – Withdrew
2020 – Banned
2022 – Did not enter

Honours
UNIFAC Cup :
Champions: 1999
UDEAC Championship :
Champions: 1985, 1988
Runner-up: 1989

Minor
CEMAC Cup :
Champions: 2013
Runner-up: 2007

References

External links

 Homepage of the national team
 Gabon at FIFA.com
 National football team of Gabon picture

 
African national association football teams